A list of windmills in the German state of Brandenburg.

References

Windmills
Economy of Brandenburg
Brandenburg